Lucas Elliot Null (born July 7, 1990) is an American actor, stand-up comedian, singer, and musician. Null is best known for his brief tenure as a cast member on the NBC sketch comedy series Saturday Night Live during its 43rd season between 2017 and 2018.

After leaving SNL, he began work on an album to be distributed through the comedy label 800 Pound Gorilla. The album is titled Guitar Comic and was released on June 26, 2019.

References

External links

American male comedians
American male television actors
American sketch comedians
21st-century American male actors
Comedians from Ohio
Living people
Male actors from Cincinnati
1990 births
21st-century American comedians